Singerman is a surname. Notable people with the surname include:

 Mookie Singerman, a member of the band Glitter Pals
 Robert Singerman (born 1942), a professor, a recognized Judaica bibliographer
 Singerman list, a numeric cataloging system for antisemitica items, as defined by the 1982 bibliographic listing
 Sydney Singerman (1896–1996), an editor
 Wesley Singerman (born 1990), an American record producer, songwriter and guitarist, and former actor